Len Harris (25 August 1924 – 19 March 1995) was a former Australian rules footballer who played with Carlton in the Victorian Football League (VFL).

Notes

External links 

Len Harris's profile at Blueseum

1924 births
1995 deaths
Carlton Football Club players
Australian rules footballers from Victoria (Australia)